Ezhou Huahu Airport  is an airport serving the cities of Ezhou, Huanggang and Huangshi in Hubei, China. The airport was developed by SF Express and the Hubei province as a logistics hub for China. Once completed, the airport will have a single terminal with two runways and logistics facilities to handle an initial operation of over two million tonnes of cargo and one million passengers annually by 2025. On 29 December 2021, the first aircraft carried out flight verification at the airport. The airport opened on 17 July 2022 for passenger service. The cargo service started in 27 November 2022.

Airlines and destinations

Passenger

Cargo

References 

Airports in Hubei